Luis Osvaldo Mariano Ibarra Araya (born 3 February 1937 – 12 November 2013) was a Chilean footballer and manager.

He was the coach who returned Universidad de Chile to first tier after winning Segunda División title.

Honours

Player
Universidad de Chile
 Campeonato Nacional (Chile): 1959

Manager
Universidad de Chile
 Segunda División: 1989

References

1937 births
2013 deaths
Chilean Primera División players
Universidad de Chile footballers
Chilean Primera División managers
Deportes Antofagasta managers
Universidad de Chile managers
Coquimbo Unido managers
Chile national football team managers
Deportes Naval managers
Association football midfielders
Chilean footballers
Chilean football managers
Huachipato managers